The Jewish Day School of Metropolitan Seattle (JDS) is the oldest community Jewish day school in the Pacific Northwest. according to its mission statement adopted in 2012, JDS serves "to provide an exceptional education that empowers Jewish children to be confident, wise, and compassionate upstanders who are committed to life-long learning and community stewardship." JDS offers an integrated curriculum of Judaic studies and general studies focusing on the "whole student," from Pre-Kindergarten to grade 8.

History 

JDS was founded in 1980 by a group of community leaders as the region's first Jewish community day school. Regardless of Jewish lineage, the school was founded with the intent of providing all students a dual education in Judaic studies and general studies. In the mid-1980s, JDS purchased a former Bellevue, Washington elementary school to establish its campus, and it still occupies it today.

Facilities 

Located in Bellevue, Washington in the Crossroads neighborhood, adjacent to Temple B'nai Torah, JDS is situated on a seven-acre campus just south of the Microsoft Main Campus.  The campus includes educational facilities with learning space, a library, a 10,000-square-foot (930 m2) athletic center, as well as a soccer and play field.

Curriculum 

JDS's integrated curriculum focuses both on Judaic Studies and general studies and is "designed to encourage the development of the whole child." In addition, its curriculum envelopes a natural language acquisition program for Hebrew.  By Grade 8, when students journey to Israel, all students are expected to be proficient.

Augmenting its curriculum, the school places special emphasis on mitzvah (community service) projects, with students expected to undertake them regularly.  In addition, each year, it has a Mitzvah Day, when everyone involved with the school is invited to work together with a community service organization to perform good deeds.

JDS students use computer labs, laptops and smart boards in the classrooms.

Recognition 

In 2011, the Partnership for Excellence in Jewish Education presented JDS with a Challenge Award for its Discovery Grant program which has strengthened enrollment by providing grants over a two-year period to new families enrolling at JDS.

In 2012, the King County Green Schools Program recognized JDS' efforts in energy conservation and recycling.

Accreditation 
 Northwest Association of Independent Schools

Affiliations 

 RAVSAK
 Partnership for Excellence in Jewish Education (PEJE)
 Seattle Foundation
 Jewish Federation of Greater Seattle
 Samis Foundation

External links 
 The Jewish Day School of Metropolitan Seattle

References 

Jewish day schools in Washington (state)
Schools in Seattle
Educational institutions established in 1980
Private middle schools in Washington (state)